The Chuukic–Pohnpeic  or historically Trukic-Ponapeic languages are a family of Micronesian languages consisting of two dialect continua, Chuukic and Pohnpeic.  They are the westernmost and historically most recent Micronesian languages.

Composition
Chuukic (Trukic)
Pohnpeic (Ponapeic)

Unique innovations
Chuukic-Pohnpeic has several unique innovations that separates it as a subgroup from the rest of Nuclear Micronesian. Among the most prominent are historical sound changes from Proto-Micronesian.

Historical sound changes
Chuukic-Pohnpeic languages share a number of historical sounds changes from Proto-Oceanic and Proto-Micronesian. Chuukic languages and Pohnpeic languages separately share later innovations.

1 Before .

Reconstructed vocabulary

References 

 
Micronesian languages